Jazestan may refer to:

Jazestan, Khuzestan
Jazestan, Yazd

See also
Jazestan Pareh